Shane Stevens may refer to:

Shane Stevens (songwriter), songwriter
Shane Stevens (author), American author of crime novels
Shane McMahon, who refereed WWE events under the name Shane Stevens